Emiddio Novi (1 January 1946 – 24 August 2018) was an Italian journalist and politician.

Novi was born in Sant'Agata di Puglia and later moved to Naples, where he served as editor of the Giornale di Napoli. He served in the Chamber of Deputies from 1994 to 1996 for Forza Italia after the Italian Socialist Party had disbanded, then unsuccessfully contested the mayoralty of Naples in 1997, while he sat in the Senate. He served as senator until 2008, and was a member of Naples City Council until 2001. Novi died in a traffic collision in his hometown of Sant'Agata di Puglia on 24 August 2018.

References

1946 births
2018 deaths
Politicians from Naples
Italian city councillors
20th-century Italian journalists
Italian male journalists
Italian newspaper editors
Forza Italia politicians
Deputies of Legislature XII of Italy
Senators of Legislature XIII of Italy
Senators of Legislature XIV of Italy
Senators of Legislature XV of Italy
People from the Province of Foggia
Politicians of Campania
20th-century Italian male writers